E. floribunda may refer to:

 Embelia floribunda, a climbing shrub
 Eria floribunda, a tropical orchid
 Erica floribunda, a winter heather
 Ervatamia floribunda, a plant with fragrant flowers
 Exocarpos floribunda, a semi-parasitic sandalwood